Stacy is an unincorporated community in Buchanan County, in the U.S. state of Virginia.

A post office was established at Stacy in 1892, and remained in operation until it was discontinued in 1961. The community was likely named for Benjamin Stacy, a settler.

References

Unincorporated communities in Virginia
Unincorporated communities in Buchanan County, Virginia